The Indian Ambassador to Switzerland is the chief diplomatic representative of India to Switzerland, Vatican City and Liechtenstein, housed in the Embassy of India, Bern. The current ambassador is Monika Kapil Mohta. who succeeded Sibi George in August, 2020 following latter's appointment as Indian ambassador to Kuwait.

List of Indian Ambassadors to Switzerland

See also
 List of ambassadors of India to France
 India–Switzerland relations

References

 
Switzerland
India